Fanny is an unincorporated community in Wyoming County, West Virginia, United States, along Indian Creek.

A post office called Fanny was established in 1907, and remained in operation until it was discontinued in 1920.

References 

Unincorporated communities in West Virginia
Unincorporated communities in Wyoming County, West Virginia